Acta Entomologica Musei Nationalis Pragae (AEMNP) is an academic journal that publishes entomological papers focused on taxonomy, morphology and phylogeny. It was founded in 1923, and was originally published under the title Sborník entomologického oddělení Národního muzea v Praze.

From 2008 onwards, it is published biannually at the end of June and December.

Authors must use English language, and follow the International Code of Zoological Nomenclature.

External links

References

Entomology journals and magazines
Publications established in 1923
Academic journals published by museums
1923 establishments in Czechoslovakia